is a Japanese anime television series which began broadcasting on the Wowow network in Japan on July 26, 2006 at midnight. The series makes use of some 3D cel-shaded animation, which achieves a more "hand drawn" look than traditional 3D animation. At Anime Boston 2007, ADV Films announced they licensed for the show (for $120,000). On July 11, 2008 ADV announced that it was discontinuing printing of the DVDs.

Plot

In the near future, after the world population and economy is devastated by a series of simultaneous hypercanes, many different factions and fledgling nations appear. In Japan, an elite class called Logos appears, controlling special zones in the country which have most of the wealth and resources. These special zones were created with the help of Power Assist Technology, which allowed Japan to recover from the consequences of the worldwide disaster (which included a combination of land subsidence and rising sea levels resulting in the permanent submerging of low-lying areas and a subsequent ice age in much of the Northern Hemisphere), albeit to a strictly limited degree. The Logos exercise control over the Revenus, a lower class who mostly live in devastated and often poverty stricken zones (urban or in close proximity) and areas (rural) known as Levinas (e.g. Levinas Sector Six, Area 18) and who struggle from day to day in order to stay alive. The Revenus are generally restricted from entering the special zones, causing tension which creates a resistance movement which fights back against the Logos.

With the tagline "A Near Future Late-Shogunate Action Animation", the story draws analogies with 19th-century Japan at the end of the Tokugawa Shogunate period, just before the Boshin War.

The story proper is mainly set in 2035 AD. Jō and Jin defect from Phantom, an elite Japanese military special operations group which is used to help control the Revenus. When they escape, they take a young girl named Sana with them. The series follows them as they work to avoid being caught by Phantom and the regular military forces of the Logos. However, there are more to things than meet the eye.

Episode list
The opening theme is "Noble Roar" by Yōsei Teikoku while the ending theme is "Brand New Reason" by Fleet.

Staff
Director: Jun Kawagoe
Series Composition: Shinsuke Ōnishi
Original Character Design: Shō Kōya
Character Design: Hideki Nagamachi
Mechanical Design: Hiroshi Ogawa
Art Design: Jirō Kōno, Minoru Yasuhara
Art Director: Katsuhiro Haji
Color Design: Kōchi Usui
Cinematography Director: Megumi Saitō
3D Director: Yūichi Gotō
Editor: Masaki Sakamoto
Audio Director: Yoshikazu Iwanami
Sound Effects: Yasumasa Koyama
Sound Production: Half H•P Studio
Music: Tomohisa Ishikawa
Music Production: Lantis
Animation Production: Brain's Base
Produced by Bandai Visual

Notes

References

General references

External links
Official website 

ADV Films
Anime with original screenplays
Brain's Base
Bandai Visual
Drama anime and manga
Dystopian anime and manga
Lantis (company)
Mecha anime and manga
Post-apocalyptic anime and manga
Military science fiction
Drones in fiction
Fiction about invasions
Terrorism in fiction
Genetic engineering in fiction
Japan Self-Defense Forces in fiction
Alternate history
Wowow original programming
Television series set in the 2030s